Jean-François Foucquet S.J., also Jean-François Fouquet (12 March 1665 – 14 March 1741), was a Burgundy French Jesuit, bishop and scientist who was active in the Jesuit China missions for 22 years. He also was Titular Bishop of Eleutheropolis in Macedonia (1725–1741).

Life
Fouquet was born in Vézelay in a wealthy family. He studied at Lycée Louis le Grand in Paris. In 1681 he entered the order of the Jesuits. Four years later he taught mathematics. In 1693 he became a priest and in the following year he decided he wanted to volunteer in Asia. In 1699 he arrived in Amoy. Until 1711 he worked in Fujian and Jiangxi, then he was invited to Peking, to teach math and astronomy. He left hurriedly in 1720 with 1200 manuscripts. In Canton he had to wait one year for a French ship. He returned to Europe in 1722.

Fouquet had taken with him a Chinese man, named Jean Hu (Hu Ruowang 胡若望), who liked Paris and got lost in Quartier Latin. Hu preached for a while in the Chinese language in front of Saint-Paul-Saint-Louis, attracting a crowd. Fouquet decided to go to Rome and planned to take Hu with him; Hu did not like to travel by stagecoach, got furious and preferred to go by foot. When Fouquet set off by himself, Hu was taken with a lettre de cachet to an asylum in Charenton, etc.

On 8 June 1723, Fouquet was received by Pope Innocent XIII. Fouquet met another Chinese in Rome, who offered him help with translating. In 1725 he was appointed as bishop of Eleutheropolis in Macedonia by Pope Benedict XIII, with Giovanni Francesco Nicolai, Titular Archbishop of Myra, and Giacinto Gaetano Chiurlia, Bishop of Giovinazzo, serving as co-consecrators. 
He remained as Titular Bishop of Eleutheropolis in Macedonia until his death on 14 March 1741.

While bishop, he was the principal co-consecrator of Antoine-Joseph-Amable Feydeau, Bishop of Digne (1730); and Domenico Maria Salvini, Archbishop of Nachitschewan (1732).

He published the Tabula Chronologica Historiæ Sinicæ ("Chronological table of Chinese History"). Foucquet, a Figurist, endeavoured to show that the Book of changes (I Ching) anticipated the coming of Jesus Christ.

Works
De la Doctrine et des Livres des Chinois
Tabula Chronologica Historiæ Sinicæ Connexa cum Cyclo qui vulgo Kia-Tse dicitur

Notes

References
 John W. Witek S.J., Controversial ideas in China and in Europe: a biography of Jean-François Foucquet, S.J., (1665-1741), Institutum Historicum S.I., Roma, 1982
 David E. Mungello The Great Encounter of China and the West, 1500-1800: 1500-1800 Rowman & Littlefield, 2005, 
 Jean-Claude Martzloff, Jaques (FRW) Gernet, Jean (FRW) Dhombres A History of Chinese Mathematics, Springer, 2006 , 

1665 births
1741 deaths
17th-century French Jesuits
18th-century French Jesuits
Jesuit missionaries in China
Roman Catholic missionaries in China
French Roman Catholic bishops in Asia
French sinologists
18th-century French historians
French male non-fiction writers
French expatriates in China
French Roman Catholic missionaries
Bishops appointed by Pope Benedict XIII
Jesuit bishops